Sam or Sammy Walker may refer to:

Sam Walker (American football), American football coach
Sam Walker (rugby league) (born 2002), Australian rugby league player
Sam Walker (rugby union) (1912–1972), Irish rugby union player
Sam Walker (golfer) (born 1978), English professional golfer
Sam Walker (footballer) (born 1991), English professional footballer
Sam Walker (table tennis) (born 1995), English table tennis player
Sam Walker (weightlifter) (born 1950), American Olympic weightlifter
Sam S. Walker (1925–2015), U.S. Army general

See also
Sammy Walker (disambiguation)
Samuel Walker (disambiguation)